LinkAja! is an Indonesian digital wallet service. The service was originally launched in 2007 by an Indonesian mobile operator Telkomsel as Telkomsel Cash, branded as TCASH. It is developed by PT Fintek Karya Nusantara, a company owned by various state-owned companies; including Telkomsel – itself a subsidiary of Telkom Indonesia, state-owned banks (Bank Mandiri, BRI, BNI, and BTN), Pertamina, Jiwasraya, and Danareksa.

On March 26, 2020, LinkAja partnered with Telcoin, an instant, low-cost blockchain powered remittance service. This partnership is set to explore cashless opportunities in LinkAjas area of operation.

The name "Link" comes from an interbank network in Indonesia with the same name. The network is owned by State-owned Banks Association (HIMBARA), comprising the four banks above. The network provides cash withdrawal and inquiry services in their network.

References

Interbank networks
Financial services companies of Indonesia
Telkom Indonesia
Bank Rakyat Indonesia
Bank Mandiri